Slawko Klymkiw is a Canadian philanthropist who has been the long-running CEO of the Canadian Film Centre.  Klymkiw was an executive at the Canadian Broadcasting Corporation, in 2005, when he became CED of the CFC.

Klymkiw joined the CBC in 1980, rising to assume the executive directorship of network programming in 1996.

Klymkiw is also an ex-officio member of the Toronto International Film Festival's Board of Directors.

References

External links
 

Canadian philanthropists
Canadian businesspeople
Canadian Broadcasting Corporation people
Living people
Year of birth missing (living people)